Artemas, Saint Artemas of Lystra, is a Christian biblical figure.

Artemas may also refer to:

People

Government and politics
Artemas Hale (1783–1882), U.S. Representative from Massachusetts
Artemas Ward (1727–1800), American Revolutionary War General and U.S. Representative from Massachusetts
Artemas Ward, Jr. (1762–1847), son of Artemas Ward, also a U.S. Representative from Massachusetts

Religion
Artemas Bishop (1795–1872), American missionary and father of Sereno Edwards Bishop
Artemas Wyman Sawyer (1827–1907), American Baptist minister and educator 
Proculus of Pozzuoli (died c. 305 AD), also known as Artemas, a Christian martyr

Other fields
Artemas Ward (writer) (1848–1925), American author and advertising executive, writer of The Grocer's Encyclopedia

Other uses
 The Artemas Poems, a collection by American poet Jerry Wemple
 Statue of Artemas Ward, a 1936 statue in Ward Circle, Washington, D.C.
 SS Artemas Ward, a U.S. Liberty ship used in World War II

See also
Artema, a genus of spider in the family Pholcidae
Artemis (disambiguation)
Artemus (disambiguation)